Anna Palk (23 October 1941 – 1 July 1990) was an English actress.

Palk was born in Looe, Cornwall, England and educated at Rise Hall Convent in the East Riding of Yorkshire, and trained as an actress at the Royal Academy of Dramatic Art in London. She followed this with rep at Bristol, Leatherhead, Derby, Newcastle upon Tyne and Leeds before embarking on a successful film and television career. Her stage appearances included productions of 'Smith By Any Other Name', 'School for Scandal', 'Present Laughter', 'Butley' (in Vienna), 'Sexual Perversity in Chicago' and a number of national tours. She was married to stockbroker Derek Brierley with whom she had a son, Jonathan.

Her film appearances included Play It Cool (1962), The Earth Dies Screaming (1964), The Skull (1965), Fahrenheit 451 (1966), The Frozen Dead (1966), The Nightcomers (1971) and Tower of Evil (1972).

She also appeared on TV in Witch Hunt (1967), The Persuaders! (episode "The Time and the Place", 1970),  Jason King (1971), The Protectors (1972–1974), as Sarah Courtney in The Main Chance (21 episodes, 1969–72), possibly her best known role, and in Bognor (1981–82).

She died in 1990 in London, England, of cancer.

Filmography
Play It Cool (1962) – Ann Bryant
The Earth Dies Screaming (1964) – Lorna
The Skull (1965) – Maid
Fahrenheit 451 (1966) – Jackie (uncredited)
The Frozen Dead (1966) – Jean Norberg
Mini Weekend (1968) – Girl in cinema
The Nightcomers (1971) – New Governess
Tower of Evil (1972) – Nora

References

External links

1941 births
1990 deaths
Alumni of RADA
English film actresses
English stage actresses
English television actresses
Deaths from cancer in England
People from Looe
20th-century English actresses
20th-century British businesspeople